The Dulux Show was an Australian television game show which aired in 1957. It was hosted by Jack Davey, and produced by Sydney station ATN-7, also airing in Melbourne on station GTV-9.  Contestants competed for the chance to win a plane trip to a location like London or San Francisco. As the title suggests, it was sponsored by Dulux paint. As was also the case with many American series of the era, early Australian television series sometimes featured the name of the sponsor in the title.

The program was a simulcast of a long-running Jack Davey radio programs, broadcast on the Macquarie Radio Network.

Episode status
Of the 37+ episodes produced, five are confirmed to survive at the National Film and Sound Archive, along with episodes of a radio version

See also
The Pressure Pak Show and Give it a Go, two other game shows hosted by Jack Davey in 1957.

References

External links
 

1957 Australian television series debuts
Black-and-white Australian television shows
Seven Network original programming
Nine Network original programming
English-language television shows
1950s Australian game shows
Australian radio programs
Television series based on radio series